Kleinreifling is a village in the district of Steyr-Land in Upper Austria, Austria. It has a population of about 760 people. Kleinreifling is part of the municipality Weyer and is on the river Enns.

References

External links 
 Marktgemeinde Weyer

Cities and towns in Steyr-Land District